Temnora funebris is a moth of the family Sphingidae first described by William Jacob Holland in 1893. It is known from the forests of western Africa to the Democratic Republic of the Congo, Uganda, Tanzania and Zimbabwe.

The length of the forewings is 23–29 mm. It is very similar to Temnora marginata, but larger. The wings are longer and narrower and the termen of the forewings is much more oblique and the tornus is less prominent. The fore tibiae are white and abdominal tufts long and cinnamon brown (paler than the abdomen). The anal tuft is longer and more slender.

References

Temnora
Moths described in 1893
Moths of Sub-Saharan Africa
Lepidoptera of Uganda
Lepidoptera of Angola
Insects of the Central African Republic
Lepidoptera of the Republic of the Congo
Lepidoptera of Gabon
Lepidoptera of Tanzania
Lepidoptera of Zambia
Lepidoptera of Zimbabwe